Edwardsville Township is located in Madison County, Illinois, in the United States. As of the 2010 census, its population was 37,657 and it contained 15,482 housing units.

It includes the city of Edwardsville.

Geography

Demographics

References

External links
City-data.com
Illinois State Archives

Townships in Madison County, Illinois
Townships in Illinois